Marquette is a provincial electoral district in the Montreal region of Quebec, Canada, that elects members to the National Assembly of Quebec. It comprises the cities of Dorval, L'Île-Dorval, and the Lachine borough of Montreal.

It was created for the 1981 election from parts of Jacques-Cartier, Marguerite-Bourgeoys and Notre-Dame-de-Grâce electoral districts.

In the change from the 2001 to the 2011 electoral map, it lost the part of LaSalle borough that it formerly had to Marguerite-Bourgeoys electoral district.

Members of the National Assembly

Election results

* Result compared to Action démocratique

References

External links
Information
 Elections Quebec

Election results
 Election results (National Assembly)

Maps
 2011 map (PDF)
 2001 map (Flash)
2001–2011 changes (Flash)
1992–2001 changes (Flash)
 Electoral map of Montreal region
 Quebec electoral map, 2011

Dorval
Provincial electoral districts of Montreal
Marquette
Lachine, Quebec